Ghazi Guidara (born 18 May 1974 at sfax) is a former Tunisian male volleyball player. He was part of the Tunisia men's national volleyball team. He competed with the national team at the 2004 Summer Olympics in Athens, Greece. He played with E.S. Tunis in 2004.

Clubs
  E.S. Tunis (2004)

See also
 Tunisia at the 2004 Summer Olympics

References

1974 births
Living people
Tunisian men's volleyball players
Place of birth missing (living people)
Volleyball players at the 1996 Summer Olympics
Volleyball players at the 2004 Summer Olympics
Olympic volleyball players of Tunisia
20th-century Tunisian people
21st-century Tunisian people